El Hamadia is a town and commune in Bordj Bou Arréridj Province, Algeria. According to the 1998 census it has a population of 20,635.

References

Communes of Bordj Bou Arréridj Province